A list of films produced in the Cinema of Austria in the 1990s ordered by year of release. For an alphabetical list of articles on Austrian films see :Category:Austrian films.

1990

1991

1992

1993

1994

1995

1996

1997

1998

1999

External links
 Austrian film at the Internet Movie Database
http://www.austrianfilm.com/

1990s
Austrian
Films

de:Liste österreichischer Filme